The Vijay for Best Debut Actress is given by STAR Vijay as part of its annual Vijay Awards ceremony for Tamil  (Kollywood) films.

The list
Here is a list of the award winners and the films for which they won.

Nominations
2007 Anjali – Kattradhu Thamizh
Andrea – Pachaikili Muthucharam
Bhanu – Thamirabharani
Tanisha – Unnale Unnale
Vijayalakshmi – Chennai 600028
2008 Parvathy – Poo
Kangana Ranaut – Dhaam Dhoom
Sameera Reddy – Vaaranam Aayiram
Swathi – Subramaniapuram
2009 Ananya – Naadodigal
Abhinaya – Naadodigal
Anuya Bhagvath – Siva Manasula Sakthi
Rupa Manjari – Thiru Thiru Thuru Thuru
Shammu – Kanchivaram
2010 Amala Paul – Mynaa
Amy Jackson – Madrasapattinam
Samantha – Baana Kaathadi
Nandhagi – Aval Peyar Thamizharasi
Oviya – Kalavani
2011 Richa Gangopadhyay – Mayakkam Enna
Hansika Motwani – Mappillai
Taapsee Pannu – Aadukalam
Shruti Haasan – 7aam Arivu
Iniya – Vaagai Sooda Vaa
2012 Varalaxmi Sarathkumar – Podaa Podi
 Lakshmi Menon – Sundarapandian
 Manisha Yadav – Vazhakku Enn 18/9
 Nandita Swetha – Attakathi
 Urmila Mahanta – Vazhakku Enn 18/9
 2013 Nazriya Nazim – Neram
 Aishwarya Arjun – Pattathu Yaanai
 Sri Divya – Varuthapadatha Valibar Sangam
 Surabhi – Ivan Veramathiri
 Thulasi Nair – Kadal
 2014 Malavika Nair – Cuckoo
Akhila Kishore – Kathai Thiraikathai Vasanam Iyakkam
Anandhi – Kayal
Catherine Tresa – Madras
Shivada Nair – Nedunchaalai

See also
 Tamil cinema
 Cinema of India

References

Debut Actress
Film awards for debut actress